Sealab 2021 is an American adult animated television series created by Adam Reed and Matt Thompson for Cartoon Network's late-night programming block, Adult Swim. Cartoon Network aired the show's first three episodes in December 2000 before the official inception of the Adult Swim block on September 2, 2001, with the final episode airing on April 24, 2005. Sealab 2021 is one of the four original Williams Street series that premiered in 2000 before Adult Swim officially launched, the others being Aqua Teen Hunger Force, The Brak Show, and Harvey Birdman, Attorney at Law.

Much like Adult Swim's Space Ghost Coast to Coast, the animation used stock footage from a 1970s Hanna-Barbera cartoon, in this case the short-lived, environmentally-themed Sealab 2020, along with original animation. The show was a satirical parody of both the original Sealab series and the general conventions of the 1970s animated children's series. While there was initial resistance from several of the original series' creators to the reuse of their characters, production moved forward on the series. Sealab 2021 was produced by 70/30 Productions.

Episodes

Production
Adam Reed and Matt Thompson, the creators and writers of Sealab 2021, came up with the idea for the show in 1995 while they were production assistants for Cartoon Network. The duo created  High Noon Toons in the mid-1990s; this was a three-hour programming block of cartoons hosted by cowboy hand puppets. Thompson and Reed were usually heavily intoxicated while working on the show, and were reprimanded at one point for lighting one of the prop sets on fire. They stumbled on a tape of the show Sealab 2020, and wrote replacement dialogue. Cartoon Network passed on the show because it did not believe it was funny. Five years after quitting Cartoon Network, the two went back to the original tape, this time making the characters do what they wanted. Cartoon Network bought the show, coincidentally around the same time that Adult Swim was created. The original "pitch pilot" is available on the Season 1 DVD as a special feature.

Very few of the episodes of the series share any continuity or ongoing plot. For instance, the entire installation is destroyed at the end of many episodes, and crew members are often killed in horrible ways, only to return in the following episode. There are occasional running gags, such as the "Grizzlebee's" restaurant chain, a parody of Applebee's and Bennigan's, the character of Sharko, and Prescott, the half-man, half-tentacle monster "from the network". It contains many references to the pop culture of the 1980s–2000s and makes use of other cartoons from the 1970s besides that on which it is based, such as 1973's Butch Cassidy for the on-screen appearances of the Sealab writers, and various one-off appearances of other characters.

Characters
 Captain Hazel "Hank" Murphy (Harry Goz) is the ostensible leader of the crew, though his qualifications, and even his grasp on reality, are questionable. He is generally found loitering on the bridge, neglecting his duties. Murphy spends his time participating in scams and juvenile antics, generally causing problems that the crew has to solve. The only episode which features Murphy acting responsibly throughout is "7211", which is a faithful reenactment of the original Sealab 2020 show. Captain Murphy is a parody of Captain Mike Murphy from Sealab 2020. Generally, Murphy is incapable to the point of incompetence. On more than one occasion, it has been implied that Murphy has gone insane due to the amount of time he has spent underwater. However, the crew either does not notice this or does not care and usually follow his orders, even when they will directly lead to the crew's deaths. Murphy is a practicing Alvian and has a deep-seated fear of doppelgängers and especially flashlights, the latter a fear for which there is no name. After the death of Harry Goz, Murphy was written out of the show by having him leave Sealab to fight in the "Great Spice Wars." It is implied that Murphy is the leader of the Rebel forces in this war, though the reasoning behind this is or its effect on the war is never explored. A recap montage of Murphy's moments were played in the final episode in memory of his voice actor. However, he later appeared in Archer, where he was voiced by Jon Hamm and debuted in the two-part episode "Sea Tunt".
 Captain Bellerophon "Tornado" Shanks (Michael Goz) is a retired football coach and health and hygiene teacher who lost his job for slapping (or throat punching) a student. He answered Sealab's help wanted ad and became the new captain, despite having no experience whatsoever. Shanks is from Texas and is the youngest of several brothers all named after characters in Greek mythology, and all of whom met their death on or around a bridge in Shanks's hometown. Dropping his Southern accent late in the series (citing that some viewers thought he was gay), Shanks' personality bears a resemblance to Captain Murphy, being voiced by Harry Goz's son. However, Shanks is much more self-aware than Murphy, openly commenting on the odd goings-on aboard Sealab and even the fact that he is on a television program. Since Shanks has no experience or idea what he is doing, he goes along with whatever the rest of the crew suggests, usually with disastrous results. Captain Shanks debuted in the season 3 episode "Tornado Shanks."
 Lieutenant Jodene Sparks (Bill Lobley) is the station's radio operator who is always seen sitting with his headsets on. Sparks is a parody of Lieutenant Sparks from Sealab 2020. Sparks mostly uses the radio for his own personal purposes, even going so far as to disconnect vital transmissions that interrupt him. He generally travels around in his office chair, mostly because he is lazy, even though it was suggested that he is crippled. Sparks is a convict serving time at Sealab while still operating a black market distillery and takes part in a wide variety of other illegal activities. He occasionally serves as a voice of reason to the crew, particularly to Murphy. However, he is just as often the catalyst of problems aboard Sealab, including Sealab's destruction. He is claustrophobic and a Malkin, the show's version of Wiccan. Sparks's quest for money has been in several plots, such as the murdering of the crew to collect on life insurance policies, the creation of Stimutacs to "make an assload of money," and his numerous underhand deals with Paddy O'Reilly, and the various Daves. An early episode revealed that he acts as a criminal mastermind called "Overlord" with a hollowed-out volcano base and an army of minions. Episode 46 reveals he enjoys hentai with themes of forced submission and humiliation. Rank: Commander.
 Debbie "White Debbie" DuPree (Kate Miller) is a marine biologist and one of only two adult women on the base. Serving as a parody of Gail from Sealab 2020, she is a blonde and is often the object of the sexual interest of the males on Sealab. She has an ongoing sexual relationship with Doctor Quinn, and their relationship, its ups and downs, and its effect on the rest of the crew play out in several stories. When she is on the outs with Quinn, the other males, particularly Stormy, attempt to get on her good side. Debbie's mood swings are a constant issue to the crew, as she changes wildly from the sole voice of reason to a shrieking lunatic. Debbie picked up the "White Debbie" appellation at the behest of Doctor Quinn, who thought it was unfair that Debbie Love went by "Black Debbie" while Debbie Dupree was simply Debbie. Nevertheless, few of the crew actually call her that. Rank: Lieutenant Commander.
 Derek "Stormy" Waters (Ellis Henican) is a pretty boy lacking in intelligence or seemingly any qualifications to be working on a government research lab, and a parody of Hal from Sealab 2020. Stormy's job is never clearly defined and he usually walks around Sealab doing whatever he wants or acts as a henchman or assistant to whomever he is nearest. Stormy usually works alongside Quinn, who frequently is the victim of Stormy's ignorance, but is ironically the most tolerant of him. The two frequently find themselves in Odd Couple-like situations. Stormy has shown skill in the operation of the submersible Deep Diver, both as a pilot and gunner, as well as operating other technological gadgets, though he is just as irresponsible in those positions as anywhere else. The crew has been shown to dislike or mistreat Stormy on multiple occasions, such as putting a sign outside the mess hall saying "No Stormies" when they held a pizza party or forgetting that he was trapped outside of the closet with Murphy's dogs. Stormy is a proudly practicing Alvian, like Murphy. Of all characters, Stormy is the most different in the episode "7211". In the episode, he directs the rest of the crew effectively in the salvage of the damaged sub. He is allergic to shellfish. Rank: Lieutenant Commander.
 Dr. Quentin Q. Quinn (Brett Butler) is the science officer. Parodying Ed from Sealab 2020, he is an extremely intelligent African-American with an IQ of 260 and Ph.D.s in several scientific disciplines, of which he is not shy about reminding the other characters. Quinn grew up in unbelievably over-the-top poverty and got to where he is through hard work, unlike the majority of the other characters. He is regarded as an uptight killjoy by most of the crew. Quinn is often the only responsible crew member and the sole voice of reason. This has caused the other crew to neglect their duties even further, as they believe "Quinn will handle it." Despite his intelligence, Quinn is extremely vain and prone to outbursts of anger when he is not appreciated. Quinn often attempts to prevent Murphy's questionable plans from being enacted, leading Murphy to distrust Quinn. However, Murphy is aware that he and the station completely depend on Quinn, going so far as to snake his vacation to ensure that he does not leave the station. Quinn has an ongoing sexual relationship with Debbie Dupree. In the first episode, he revealed that he inhabits a robot body of his own design. Rank: Lieutenant Commander.
 Marco Rodrigo Diaz de Vivar Gabriel Garcia Marquez (Erik Estrada) is the station's engineer. Spoofing Dr. Paul Williams from Sealab 2020, he is very strong and muscular, unlike the rest of the crew. He speaks with a Spanish accent and often exclaims random things in Spanish, although not actually speaking the language. Quinn even remarks that his Spanish is terrible. His name comes from both the Spaniard epic 11th-century poem Cantar del Mio Cid, which featured the character Rodrigo Díaz de Vivar, and from the 1982 Literary Nobel Prize winner journalist and novelist Gabriel García Márquez. Marco's exact heritage is unknown, though he is fiercely not a Spaniard. Marco is prone to violence, both in the defense of the crew and against them. Marco often argues with Murphy about his methods and seems to be the only one to whom Murphy actually listens. Despite this, Murphy often calls Marco "mailbox head" and included a segment on his radio show where listeners could call in to tell him why they hated Marco. Marco gets along with most of the crew, especially Sparks and Quinn. Marco also interacts with the orphans on Sealab and has been shown to have a soft side. Rank: Lieutenant Commander.
 Hesh Hepplewhite (MC Chris) is the station's reactor operator and, more often than not, their whipping boy. Hesh has a habit of continually referring to himself in the third person. It was revealed that he is Jewish. Nasal-voiced, smart-mouthed, and whiny, Hesh is not well-liked by most of the crew and thus works in the part of the station farthest away from them. He has no real understanding of how the reactor works and generally has to have guidance from Quinn when there is a problem. Hesh's own interactions with the machinery are generally useless or actively destructive, such as the "hammer game," which involves smashing the computers with a hammer. Hesh generally does not participate in the crew's activities unless he interrupts on the radio. Hesh performs the birthday song at Quinn's birthday and acts as Murphy's caddie. Hesh's safety is not a concern to any of the characters, as Murphy sent him into the reactor core to recover a ball. As a result of being isolated in the reactor, Hesh has developed odd tendencies, such as dressing as a woman on multiple occasions. Rank: Lieutenant.
 Debbie "Black Debbie" Allison Love (Angela Gibbs) is both the only other adult female and the only black female on the station. She is the parody of the Sealab 2020 character Mrs. Thomas (Ed Thomas's mother). She teaches school to the Sealab's orphans and is very proud of her race. She has a relationship with Marco at the beginning of the show and briefly dates Sparks and Tornado in the later seasons. In one episode, her name is displayed on a monitor as Debbie Allison; but in another, her nameplate is shown as Debbie Love. She is a former Heisman trophy winner. Rank: Lieutenant.
 Dr. Ilad Virjay (Adam Reed) is the station's official doctor and in-house surgeon noted for his thick Indian accent and relatively normal personality. He graduated third in his class from The Medical College of Mescutabuti. He practices Manduism, the Sealab universe's version of Hinduism. Dr. Virjay is shown to be jealous of Dr. Quinn as the latter has multiple Ph.Ds and a higher IQ. Dr. Virjay delivers all his lines in a deadpan, whether informing crew members of medical issues or confronting an invisible monster shortly before his death. It is later revealed that he is also janitor for Sealab's restaurant section. Rank: Unknown.
 Dolphin Boy is a little chubby boy that speaks in dolphin noises. One of the orphans that inhabit Sealab for some reason, he is a member of Black Debbie's class. Dolphin Boy often wanders around the station and, as a result, is often embroiled in whatever is going on. When translated, Dolphin Boy generally says inoffensive, naively childish statements, universally resulting in derision and hatred from the rest of the crew. He is the target of endless fat jokes and is often killed by the Sealab crew members for no reason whatsoever. He is the persona non grata of Sealab. Rank: Lieutenant Jr. Grade.
 Sharko (Matt Thompson) is a half-human, half-shark freak of nature who is the result of Marco having sexual relations with a female shark.
 The Five Jew Bankers are a lampoon of Jewish conspiracy theories. They are introduced in "Neptunati" (Season 3 Episode 13).

International broadcast
In Canada, Sealab 2021 currently airs on the local version of Adult Swim. It previously aired on the former Teletoon at Night program block on Teletoon in English Canada.

Home media and streaming
The series has been available on HBO Max since September 1, 2020.

Reception
In January 2009, IGN listed Sealab 2021 as the 79th best in the "Top 100 Animated Series". In 2013 IGN placed Sealab 2021 as number 22 on their list of top 25 animated series for adults.

Paul Di Filippo of the website Sci Fi Weekly, in his review of the Season 3 DVD, felt that general fan opinion of the show declined sharply following the death of Harry Goz (the voice of Captain Hazel Murphy) during Season 3.

In 2021, upon the 20-year anniversary of Adult Swim, Nerdist stated of the series, "It's one thing to imagine Sealab 2021. It's another getting it on the airwaves." Boston's Rock 92.9 published an article calling it "Another masterful reworking of old cartoon footage."

Notes

References

External links

 
 
 Interview with Sealab 2021 Creator

2000 American television series debuts
2005 American television series endings
2000s American adult animated television series
2000s American comic science fiction television series
2000s American parody television series
2000s American satirical television series
2000s American surreal comedy television series
American adult animated comedy television series
American adult animated science fiction television series
American comic science fiction television series
American adult animated television spin-offs
English-language television shows
Adult Swim original programming
Cartoon Network original programming
Space Ghost Coast to Coast
Underwater civilizations in fiction
Television series by Williams Street
Television series created by Adam Reed
Television series created by Matt Thompson